Shoup is the surname of:

Carl Shoup (1902–2000), American economist
Curtis F. Shoup (1921–1945), American World War II soldier posthumously awarded the Medal of Honor
David M. Shoup (1904–1983), United States Marine Corps general and Medal of Honor recipient, 22nd Commandant of the Marine Corps
Donald Shoup (born 1938), economist and professor of urban planning at the University of California, Los Angeles
Francis A. Shoup (1834–1896), lawyer and Confederate brigadier general in the American Civil War
George L. Shoup (1836–1904), last territorial governor and first governor and one of the first state senators of Idaho
Howard Shoup (1903–1987), American costume designer 
John Shoupe (1851–1920), American professional baseball player sometimes credited as Shoup
Oliver Henry Shoup (1869–1940), 22nd Governor of Colorado
Paul Shoup (1874–1946), American businessman, father of Carl Shoup
Richard G. Shoup (1923–1995), American politician, U.S. Representative from Montana
Richard Shoup (programmer) (1943–2015), computer programmer who developed SuperPaint
Robert "Bob" Shoup, American retired professional wrestler The Pink Assassin and manager
Victor Shoup, American computer scientist and mathematician
Wally Shoup (born 1944), American jazz alto saxophonist